Stosicia aberrans is a species of minute sea snail, a marine gastropod mollusk or micromollusk in the family Zebinidae.

Distribution
This species occurs in the Caribbean Sea (Belize, Colombia, Costa Rica, Mexico, Panama) the Gulf of Mexico (Cuba, Jamaica) and the Lesser Antilles, Puerto Rico and off north-eastern Brazil.

Description 
The maximum recorded shell length is 6 mm.

Habitat 
Minimum recorded depth is 0 m. Maximum recorded depth is 93 m.

References

 Sleurs W.J.M. (1996) A revision of the Recent species of the genus Stosicia (Gastropoda: Rissoidae). Mededelingen van de Koninklijke Academie voor Weteschappen, Letteren en Schone Kunsten van België, Klasse der Wetenschappen 58(1): 117–158, 19 pls

Further reading 
 Rosenberg, G., F. Moretzsohn, and E. F. García. 2009. Gastropoda (Mollusca) of the Gulf of Mexico, Pp. 579–699 in Felder, D.L. and D.K. Camp (eds.), Gulf of Mexico–Origins, Waters, and Biota. Biodiversity. Texas A&M Press, College Station, Texas

External links
 

aberrans
Gastropods described in 1850